Espejo may refer to:
 Espejo, Córdoba, a city and commune in Spain
 Espejo Canton, a canton of Ecuador
 Espejo Lake, a lake in Argentina

People with the surname
 Antonio de Espejo, Spanish (Mexican) explorer
 Eugenio Espejo, Spanish physician
 Jerónimo Espejo, Argentine General

See also
 Lo Espejo, Chile
 Pico Espejo, Venezuela
 Premio Eugenio Espejo
 La mujer en el espejo

Spanish-language surnames